Crataegus calpodendron is a species of hawthorn native to much of the eastern United States and to Ontario, Canada. The common name late hawthorn refers to the flowering time, which is later than most North American hawthorns.

References

External links
  Pear Hawthorn, Crataegus calpodendron (Ehrh.)Medikus, Floyd County, Northwest Georgia, Southeastern United States 

calpodendron
Flora of North America